XHESO-FM is a radio station on 104.9 FM in Ciudad Obregón, Sonora, Mexico. The station is owned by Grupo Radiorama and carries its @FM contemporary hit radio format.

History
XESO-AM 1150 received its concession on December 10, 1992. It was owned by Radio Signo, S.A., a subsidiary of Radiorama, and operated with 5 kW day and 300 watts at night. Radiorama leased most of its Sonora stations to Grupo Larsa Comuncaciones in the early 2010s.

In December 2011, XESO was cleared to move to FM as XHESO-FM 104.9.

In April 2018, XHESO ditched its Fiesta Mexicana name and took on imaging matching that of its Hermosillo then-sister station XHHQ-FM as "La Número Uno". As a result of XHHQ's alliance with Larsa being dismantled, XHESO was relaunched as "La Más Chingona", in line with XHVSS-FM, in November of that year.

In August 2019, XHESO temporarily went silent as Larsa ceased its own operations in Ciudad Obregón, affecting three stations. It reemerged in September as Los 40 under ISA Multimedia management.

ISA ceased radio operations throughout the state of Sonora on December 31, 2021. A new format under direct Radiorama management, the @FM pop hits brand, was debuted in February 2022.

References

Contemporary hit radio stations in Mexico
Grupo Radiorama
Radio stations established in 1992
Radio stations in Sonora
Spanish-language radio stations